Menkhoaneng is a community council located in the Leribe District of Lesotho. Its population in 2006 was 22,502.

Villages
The community of Menkhoaneng includes the villages of: 
 
 Betha-Betha
 Boithatelo (Ha Tsolo)
 Botšaba
 Ha 'Mali
 Ha Bokoro
 Ha Bolao
 Ha Boroko
 Ha Hlatsoane
 Ha Jethe
 Ha Jobo
 Ha Khabo
 Ha Khanare
 Ha Khati
 Ha Leabua (Lentsoaneng)
 Ha Leaooa
 Ha Lebonya (Lentsoaneng)
 Ha Lehloba
 Ha Lekhoele
 Ha Leqele
 Ha Lesala (Botsola)
 Ha Letlaka
 Ha Lika
 Ha Loti
 Ha Majara
 Ha Makeleli
 Ha Makepe
 Ha Makhoa
 Ha Makhoaba (Menkhoaneng)
 Ha Mali
 Ha Mamafofo
 Ha Matube
 Ha Moahloli
 Ha Mohale
 Ha Molotha
 Ha Montso
 Ha Motsarapane
 Ha Nkhasi
 Ha Nkopa
 Ha Ntja
 Ha Ntsoakele
 Ha Peete (Seqhobong)
 Ha Pentši
 Ha Phalole
 Ha Puseletso (Hlobola)
 Ha Qobete (Litsiphong)
 Ha Ramabele
 Ha Sebaka (Botsola)
 Ha Sekere
 Ha Sekolotsa (Menkhoaneng)
 Ha Selebalo ('Mate)
 Ha Sepenya
 Ha Seqhoang
 Ha Seturumane
 Ha Thella
 Ha Tjotji
 Ha Tlali
 Hata-Butle
 Hata-Butle (Botsola)
 Hlokoa-Le-Monate
 Itsokolele
 Karammele
 Kholokoe
 Khopising (Ha Khabo)
 Konkotia
 Lepalole
 Libeleteng
 Lifoleing (Mabokong)
 Likileng
 Linotšing
 Liphaleng
 Mabokong
 Mafaleng
 Mafikeng
 Mahana-Puso
 Mahlabatheng
 Makanyaneng
 Makong
 Maliba-Matso
 Mapheaneng (Ha Khabo)
 Masianokeng
 Mate
 Matjana (Bothoba)
 Menkhoaneng
 Metolong
 Mohlakeng
 Mokoallong
 Nqobelle
 Phelandaba
 Phutha (Menkhoaneng)
 Saka-Lefubelu (Botsola)
 Sebolong
 Tau-Li-Ea-Rora
 Tau-Lia-Rora
 Teraeshareng
 Thabana-Tšooana
 Thopo (Mokoallong)
 Thotaneng (Ha Khabo)
 Thoteng
 Thoteng (Ha 'Mali)
 Tsieng (Ha Khabo)
 Tsitsa

References

External links
 Google map of community villages

Populated places in Leribe District